Jacques Heim is a French-born dance choreographer who founded Diavolo Dance Theater in 1992 after graduating from California Institute of the Arts. He was born and raised in Paris, France. As a young man, Heim moved to New York City, and shortly thereafter received his BFA in Theater, Dance, and Film at Middlebury College in Vermont. He then moved to England and received his Certificate for Analysis and Criticism of Dance from University of Surrey. After his stay in England he came back to America, only this time to California, where he would receive his MFA in Choreography from the California Institute of the Arts.

DIAVOLO | Architecture in Motion
In 1992, Jacques Heim founded DIAVOLO | Architecture in Motion, a dance company based in Los Angeles, California. It is a highly original contemporary dance ensemble that uses "architecture in motion" to explore the relationship between the human body and its environment. DIAVOLO blends modern dance, acrobatics, and gymnastics, and other forms of movement to create the stylistically varied and intensely physical choreography that has become the hallmark of this company.

DIAVOLO is one of the most successful dance companies based in Los Angeles, being only 1 of 3 companies to endure and create for 25 years in Los Angeles. Heim describes the work of his company as "architecture in motion", because the company explores the relation and interaction between the human body and its architectural environment to understand how we are being affected not only socially, but physically and emotionally. Throughout the years, DIAVOLO has been noted as one of the forerunners in the dance community, as noted by the LA Times, "Jacques Heim's locally based Diavolo again proved that its brand of iconoclastic movement might very well be the dance bridge to the 21st century."

The company has a second branch, the DIAVOLO Institute, which provides educational and outreach opportunities to people of all ages and abilities while touring and at home in Los Angeles, sharing the pioneering art form and the power of dance as a means of social impact.

In 2016, The DIAVOLO Institute expanded their programs and created The Veterans Project. Conceived by DIAVOLO Executive Director Jennifer Cheng and led by DIAVOLO Artistic Director Jacques Heim, The Veterans Project is equal parts community, creativity and discovery and is one of the most ambitious and humbling undertakings in DIAVOLO's 25-year history. Inspired by Sebastian Junger's novel Tribe and the rich stories of the veterans in our own community, this program gives its veteran participants new victories in their post-service lives and begins to truly restore the core inner strengths of hope, optimism, self-belief and resiliency that had diminished during their difficult transition back into civilian life. The Veterans Project's Phase 1 first premiered in 2016 at the Hollywood American Legion Post 43. The program was met with such incredible support that Phase 2 was initiated and premiered on Veteran's Day in 2017 (November 11, 2017) at the Valley Performing Arts Center, newly renamed Younes and Soraya Nazarian Center for the Performing Arts.

Choreography
Heim not only choreographs a number of short and full-length works for DIAVOLO, but has directed many projects around the United States and internationally. One of his most notable choreographic achievements was invitation by Cirque du Soleil to choreograph the show, Kà, which premiered in 2005 at the MGM Grand Las Vegas hotel. KÀ has been named "the most technically advanced production in the Western Hemisphere and perhaps the world" and in 2016, the Las Vegas Weekly wrote, "KÀ’s technical marvel remains unmatched". It is without a doubt that KÀ remains is one of the greatest shows in the history of Las Vegas. Merge Kà's elite human performances with the ever-evolving technology put at Cirque du Soleil's disposal and you are left with a stunning show that stays with you for days.

Most recently, Jacques Heim and DIAVOLO were seen on Season 12 of America's Got Talent, and finished in the top 10. Each week, Heim created stunning new works with DIAVOLO's one-of-a-kind structures to push the group into the season finale. Simon Cowell, Howie Mandel, MelB, and Heidi Klum unanimously agreed throughout the season that the company's highly original and daring approach to entertainment was unlike anything they have ever seen.

In 2005, Heim was also the Artistic Director for the Taurus World Stunt Awards, and in 2007 he returned to Taurus to stage a stunt piece called "The Car". He was the Creative Director for the Opening Ceremony of The 16th Asian Games, in Guangzhou, China His work has made appearances on the television shows Dancing with the Stars and Step It Up and Dance, as well as on the theatrical stage, as he created choreography for the play, The Stones.

Jacques has also taught dance at Ballet Pacifica, California State University, Los Angeles and the University of California, Los Angeles.

Awards and press
Heim has received three USA Fellowship nominations and four Alpert Awards in the Arts nominations. He received the Martha Hill Choreography Award of the American Dance Festival, as well as the Special Prize of the Jury at the 6th Saitama International Dance Festival. Heim also was awarded a Brody Arts Fund fellowship, and a James Irvine Foundation Fellowship.

Family history
Heim's grandfather, also named Jacques Heim, was a Parisian fashion designer who invented the bikini alongside Louis Réard.

References

French choreographers
Living people
1964 births